Ekaterina Vasilyevna Khuraskina (born 21 August 1989) is a Russian modern pentathlete. At the 2012 Summer Olympics, she competed in the women's competition, finishing in 17th place. Khuraskina was born in Moscow.

References

External links
 
 

1989 births
Living people
Russian female modern pentathletes
Olympic modern pentathletes of Russia
Modern pentathletes at the 2012 Summer Olympics

Sportspeople from Moscow
21st-century Russian women